Brahmavar (Goan) Orthodox Church is a split faction from the Catholic Church formed under the leadership of Bishop Antonio Francisco Xavier Alvares in 1889.

He was excommunicated, stripped naked and paraded through the streets. He left the Church with some hundreds of Goan Catholic families and joined the Malankara Orthodox Church and the Brahmavar (Konkani) community has come into existence since then as a part of the Indian Orthodox Church.

Antonio Francisco Xavier Alvares was ordained as the first Orthodox Metropolitan of Goa, Ceylon and Greater India in 1889 A. D. by Paulose Mar Athanasius and Geevarghese Mar Gregorios of Parumala at the Orthodox Theological Seminary, Kottayam in the state of Kerala.

Presently, they are under the Brahmavar diocese of Malankara (Indian) Orthodox Church.

References

Saint Thomas Christians
Malankara Orthodox Syrian Church
1889 establishments in Portuguese India
Oriental Orthodox organizations established in the 19th century
Religious organizations established in 1889